Taking 300 or more wickets across a playing career is considered a significant achievement in One Day International (ODI) cricket. The feat, first accomplished by Pakistani fast bowler Wasim Akram in October 1996, has only been achieved by 14 cricketers in the history of the game as of March 2022. Akram was also the first player to achieve the 400 and 500 wicket feats. Four Sri Lankan players have taken 300 or more wickets, along with three Pakistanis, two Australians, two Indians, one New Zealander and one South African player and one Bangladeshi. England, the West Indies and Zimbabwe are yet to see a player reach the 300 mark.

Sri Lankan bowler Muttiah Muralitharan has the highest aggregate with 534 wickets; he also has 10 five-wicket hauls. Australian Glenn McGrath has the best bowling average (22.02) among players who have taken 300 or more wickets. In terms of matches played, Brett Lee—another Australian cricketer—took the fewest (171) to accomplish the feat. South African fast bowler Shaun Pollock is the most economical with 3.67 runs per over, whereas Lee has the best strike rate of 29.4 balls per wicket. Sri Lankan Chaminda Vaas' eight wickets for 19 runs against Zimbabwe in 2001 remains the only occasion where a bowler has taken eight wickets in an ODI. Waqar Younis's 13 five-wicket hauls remain the most by any bowler . Shakib Al Hasan is the only active player who is having 300 wickets in ODI.

Among the bowlers who have taken over 300 wickets in ODIs, Sanath Jayasuriya is the only cricketer who has also joined 10,000 runs club in ODI cricket.

Key

 Mat. – Number of matches played
 Inn. – Number of innings bowled
 Balls – Balls bowled in career
 Runs – Runs conceded in career
 Wkts – Wickets taken in career
 Ave. – Average runs per wicket
 Econ. – Runs conceded per over
 SR. – Number of balls bowled per wicket taken
 BBM – Best bowling in a match
 5w/i – Five or more wickets in an innings
Period – Cricketing career of the player

List of bowlers in 300-wicket club
The list is initially arranged by the most number of wickets taken by a bowler. To sort this table by any statistic, click on the applicable header box beside (not on) the column title.

Last updated: 25 March 2022

By country

See also
 List of One Day International cricket records
 List of bowlers who have taken 300 or more wickets in Test cricket
 List of bowlers who have taken 100 or more wickets in Twenty20 International

References

One Day International cricket records